Pritikin may refer to:

 Bob Pritikin, author and advertising executive
 Greg Pritikin, filmmaker
 Jerry Pritikin, baseball fan
 Jon Pritikin (born 1973), motivational speaker
 Nathan Pritikin (1915–1985), nutritionist
 Renny Pritikin, director of the Nelson Gallery

See also
 Pritikin Diet